Konovalchuk or Konowalchuk is a Ukrainian-language surname derived from the occupation of  konoval [ коновал ], an archaic term for "veterinarian", literally meaning "descendant of konoval". Notable people with this surname include:

Volodymyr Konovalchuk, Ukrainian footballer
Steve Konowalchuk, American  ice hockey player

See also
Konovalenko
Konovalov, Russian surname with the same derivation
Konovalyuk

Ukrainian-language surnames
Occupational surnames
Patronymic surnames